Vol. 2 is the second studio album by Radio Company. It was released on May 7, 2021, by Two Chair Entertainment. The band started working on the album in January 2020 and finished recording on June 13, 2020.  

The album was released along with Vol. 1 on CD in a double release. The album was released on vinyl on March 21, 2022.

Singles 
A music video for "City Grown Willow" was released on April 2, 2021.

"Quarter To" was released on April 9, 2021.

Usage in Media 
"All My Livin' Time" was featured in season 2 episode 14 of CW's Walker of which Jensen Ackles directed.

Track listing 
All tracks were written by Carlson and Ackles. All tracks were produced by Carlson.

Personnel 

Jensen Ackles – vocals, backing vocals, writer 
Steve Carlson – vocals, backing vocals, writer , producer , electric guitar, acoustic guitar, piano, bass, lap steel, synth, mandolin
Eric Tessmer – electric guitar 
Sheree Smith – backing vocals
Angela Miller – backing vocals
Bukka Allen – piano, organ, keyboards
Pat Manske – drums , mixing engineer 
Tom Freund – upright bass 
Chris Masterson – guitar 
Topaz McGarrigle – saxophone
Steward Cole – trumpet
Matt Hubbard – trombone
Sarah Hall – harp
Warren Hood – violin
Brian Standefer – cello
Howie Weinberg – mastering engineer 
Tom Jean Webb – album artwork
Mishka Westell – additional design

Charts

References 

2021 albums
Radio Company albums